History of Gold Coast may refer to:

 History of Gold Coast, Queensland
 History of Gold Coast (British colony)